Hudson Marquez (born in 1947 in New Orleans, Louisiana, USA) is a painter, storyteller, writer, and video artist, whose work includes many paintings, installations with the art collective Ant Farm, the Cadillac Ranch and TVTV video productions. In his own words, he was born in New Orleans, Louisiana. He got out as soon as possible.  His travels finally led him to San Francisco where he helped found the Ant Farm, an arts collective that was very active in the late '60s/early '70s. He became addicted to video and in 1972 started the video group TVTV. This group of small format video pioneers had a great run, producing a number of award-winning documentaries for PBS.

References

External links
 Official Website -- This site is no longer online.

http://www.artslant.com/chi/articles/show/33427
conversation-with-hudson-marquez

Artists from New Orleans
Writers from New Orleans
Living people
1947 births